The Pact of the Embassy , also known as the Pact of the Ciudadela, is a February 19, 1913 agreement brokered by U.S. Ambassador to Mexico Henry Lane Wilson during the coup to oust democratically-elected Mexican President Francisco I. Madero. Wilson had been opposed to Madero's government from its beginning and had done everything he could to undermine it. In a period of the Mexican Revolution known as the Ten Tragic Days ("Decena Trágica") forces opposed to Madero had bombarded the center of Mexico City with artillery fire, with the loss of civilian life and destruction of buildings. Madero's main military man General Victoriano Huerta put up a desultory effort to combat the rebels, which some see as a "phony war".  Ambassador Wilson brought together the two rival generals whose forces were responsible for the destruction, Huerta, head of the Mexican Federal Army, in whom Madero had misplaced his trust, and General Félix Díaz, nephew of Mexican ex-President Porfirio Díaz. Wilson's aim was to broker an agreement to end the bloody violence, which a number of historians see as the pretext for the ouster of Madero.  Huerta changed his allegiance, now also plotting to oust Madero. The terms of the pact were that Díaz recognize Huerta as provisional president of Mexico, with Huerta allowing Díaz to name Huerta's cabinet, presumably with his own supporters. They further agreed that rather than holding quick elections, they would be delayed and that Huerta would support Díaz's candidacy.  The agreement was concluded while Madero remained President of Mexico, but the U.S. Ambassador's actions strongly influenced Madero's decision to resign.  According to Ambassador Wilson's memoirs, he took the action on his own account without consultation, seeing the U.S. embassy as being neutral ground for the rival generals. The signed agreement with the backing of the U.S. Ambassador persuaded President Madero and Vice President José María Pino Suárez to resign. They were arrested and they had the expectation of going into exile, as ex-President Porfirio Díaz had done in May 1911. But the two men were murdered during their transfer from the National Palace to Lecumberri National Penitentiary. Once in power, Huerta reneged on his agreement with Díaz for power-sharing and elections. Díaz went into exile.  The elections promised in the pact never occurred.

See also
United States involvement in the Mexican Revolution

References

Further reading
Katz, Friedrich. The Secret War in Mexico: Europe, the United States, and the Mexican Revolution. Chicago: University of Chicago Press 1981. 

Mexican Revolution
1913 in Mexico
Political scandals in Mexico
Mexico